The Public Health Cigarette Smoking Act is a 1970 federal law in the United States designed to limit the practice of tobacco smoking. As approved by the United States Congress and signed into law by President Richard Nixon, the act required a stronger health warning on cigarette packages, saying "Warning: The Surgeon General Has Determined that Cigarette Smoking Is Dangerous to Your Health". It also banned cigarette advertisements on American radio and television.

Origins
The Public Health Cigarette Smoking Act was one of the major bills resulting from the 1964 report by the Surgeon General, Luther Terry. The report found that lung cancer and chronic bronchitis are causally related to cigarette smoking. Congress previously passed the Cigarette Labeling and Advertising Act in 1965; requiring that all cigarette packages sold in the United States carry a health warning. But after a recommendation by the Federal Trade Commission, the Public Health Cigarette Smoking Act amended the 1965 law so that the warnings are made in the name of the Surgeon General.

One of the major advocates of the cigarette advertising ban was the Federal Communications Commission. The FCC argued that since the topic of smoking is controversial, numerous TV and radio stations continued to break the Fairness Doctrine when airing these commercials because they did not give equal time to the opposing viewpoint that smoking is dangerous.

Passage in Congress: On June 17, 1969, the 91st Congress debated in House. The Public Health Cigarette Smoking Act was created because H.R. 6543 was set to expire on July 1, 1975. The purpose of H.R. 6543 was to create a warning label on cigarette packages. Before H.R. 6543 was set to expire, many people such as the Surgeon General wanted to create a stronger warning label. The bill required cigarette packages to be labeled the following, “Warning, The Surgeon General has determined that cigarette smoking is dangerous to your health and may cause lung cancer or other diseases.” During the debate, there were ongoing arguments. For example, the tobacco growers argued that they grow tobacco, not cancer. The tobacco company and growers were scared that they were going to be put out of business and the health department was scared more people would die from cigarette smoking. On, December 12, 1969, The Senate debated, amended, and passed the bill. During the debate, a chart was showed, presenting information of death rates and cigarette smoking. The chart shows that more cigarettes one smokes, the higher the death rate goes up. 

Provisions: The Public Health Cigarette Smoking Act bans cigarette commercials from airing on the radio and television. The act also strengthened the health warning label on cigarette packages. According to the CDC, The Public Health Cigarette Smoking Act also bans states or localities from promoting cigarette advertising for health related reasons.

The Public Health Cigarette Smoking Act was introduced into Congress in 1969, but it was not until April 1, 1970, when U.S. President Richard Nixon signed it into law. The actual cigarette advertising ban did not come into force until January 2, 1971, as per a compromise that allowed broadcasters to air these commercials during their telecasts of college football bowl games on New Year's Day. The last cigarette ad on U.S. television, advertising Virginia Slims, was carried on the last possible legal minute at 11:59 p.m ET/PT, 10:59 p.m. CT/MT that evening on NBC's The Tonight Show Starring Johnny Carson.

Effects
In 1981, the FTC reported that the health warning labels as mandated by the Public Health Cigarette Smoking Act had little effect on U.S. smoking habits. Congress therefore passed the Comprehensive Smoking Education Act of 1984, requiring more specific health warnings.

The tobacco industry has begun to use a variety of other marketing tools and strategies to influence people and attract new customers. In particular, ads targeted to adolescents affect their perceptions on the image and function of smoking.  In 1991, the Journal of the American Medical Association published a study showing that more children aged 5 and 6 years old, could recognize Camel cigarettes' Joe Camel mascot than Mickey Mouse or Fred Flintstone. Camel increased its adolescent customer base dramatically, from less than 1% before 1988 to more than 13% in 1993.  Tobacco sought protection from Congress so they could all leave broadcasting together without violating any anti-trust laws. The only lawsuit that followed was from a broadcaster in an effort to keep tobacco advertising on television and radio.

The law also affected advertising revenues on television and radio stations, along with the current imposition of Financial Interest and Syndication Rules and the Prime Time Access Rule, which also both took effect in 1971. NBC responded by pushing its broadcast day later into the overnight, adding shows such as The Midnight Special and Snyder's Tomorrow to open up further advertising inventory.

References

1970 in law
United States federal health legislation
Tobacco advertising
Smoking in the United States
1970 in the United States
Advertising in the United States
Advertising regulation
Regulation in the United States